The 1964 Copenhagen Series (Danish: Københavnsserien pulje A og B 1964; administratively known as the Senior Række KS 1 A and KS 1 B, 1964) was the 76th edition of the Copenhagen Football Championship since its establishment in 1889, the 62nd under the administration of Københavns Boldspil-Union (KBU) and the 6th season as one of the fifth tiers of the Danish football pyramid system. The season was launched on 4 April 1964 with five simultaneously played group A matches and five group B matches, interrupted by a two and a half month long summer break, and concluded with the last four group A league fixtures on 31 October and six group B fixtures on 8 November 1964. The season featured a Copenhagen football league structure consisting of two individual groups, with group A being composed solely of first senior men's teams, while group B was composed of reserve teams of higher ranking Copenhagen clubs. No reserve teams were eligible for promotion to the fourth tier. The clubs of the group A league entered the 1964–65 Danish Cup tournament in the second qualifying round for the Copenhagen FA's area.

BK Hero went through the season as undefeated, winning their second group A league title with an eight-point margin and more than twice as many goals scored compared to their closest league opponents, Kastrup BK, in second place, averaging four goals per game. The team had a run of nine wins and only made use of fourteen players throughout their winning season under coach Hans Hannibal. Handelsstandens BK finished at the bottom of the final league standings, for the second consecutive season, and was relegated to the 1965 KBUs Mellemrække. B.93's reserve team won their first group B league title with the reserve team of Brønshøj BK in second place.

Summary

With no KBU-members having been demoted from the 1963 Kvalifikationsturneringen to the regional top-flight league, the Copenhagen FA hence did not relegate Handelsstandens BK to the regional second-tier league, 1964 KBUs Mellemrække. Handelsstandens BK had finished the last season in the last spot in the final league standings. The match schedule for the group A league's spring season was published on 10 January 1964 by the Copenhagen FA, while the fall season's match schedule was published during the summer break.

The season was officially launched on 4 April 1926 with five league matches in group A featuring BK Frederiksholm versus Kastrup BK, BK Hellas versus BK Hero, Husum BK versus Handelsstandens BK, Østerbros BK versus BK Stefan and B 1908 versus BK Fremad Valby. The first match day included a replay of a fixture from the last round of the previous season in which last season's eighth placed team BK Fremad Valby had defeated last season's runners-up B 1908, preventing the Amager-based club from earning a promotion to the fourth tier – this first round fixture at Sundby Idrætspark between the two clubs ended in a tie. Newly promoted Østerbros BK won their first round match against Husum BK with the only goal of the match scored by Østerbros BK's Heinz Sørensen in the 48th minute in front of 500 spectators. The first goal of the season was netted by Bjarne Hansen from Handelsstandens BK in the 5th minute in the club's away game against Husum BK at Husum Idrætspark.

Kastrup BK, trained by coach Tonny Andersen since 1963, went victoriously through the first six match days, placing themselves at the top of the league standings with maximum points, having scored 16 goals with 2 goals scored against them – a great contrast compared to last season, where the club lost their first four matches and only managed to score one goal. On 3 May, Handelsstandens BK managed to tie the home clash against BK Stefan their at Østerbro Stadium, earning their first point in their fifth league match of the season. Kastrup BK lost their first match of the season against BK Hero on 21 May in front of an attendance of 900 people at Tårnby Stadium, with BK Hero's Preben Bendtner scoring the game's only goal in the 65th minute. Kastrup BK's line-up included two reserve forwards and left the field without scoring and obtaining any points for the first time in the season. BK Hero was on top of the league standings for two match days until Kastrup BK reclaimed the top spot in the 7th round and 8th round due to a better goal average. Halfway through the season, Kastrup BK were leading the KBU league with 14 points, the same number of points as BK Hero, while B 1908 was in third place with 12 points. Handelsstandens BK was in the last spot of the league standings with only one point, obtained at their tied match against BK Stefan.

Following a ten week long summer break, the fall season was inaugurated on 15 August 1964 with three league matches. On 5 September, the two closest title contenders, BK Hero and Kastrup BK, clashed again at Gladsaxe Idrætspark in front of approx. 900 spectators. BK Hero's newly arrived footballer Torben Michaelsen – a former Kastrup BK player – scored the first goal after 22 minutes of play in a match that saw BK Hero win 5–1 and make the final break-away from their closest league title contenders. BK Hero had a run of nine wins, winning all their matches in the fall season, while Kastrup BK and B 1908 trailed behind with several losses along the way. Early in the season, B 1908, under the guidance of coach Jørgen Vendelbo, frequently trailed behind the two title contenders, but in the fall season they had several encounters with the second place that was due to a streak of four winning matches, where they scored at least five goals against their opponents.

The league title was claimed by BK Hero with two rounds remaining by winning their away game 9–2 against Østerbros BK on 11 November at Østerbro Stadium, with Torben Michaelsen and Tonny Poppe scoring both scoring hat-tricks in the process. The then mayor of Gladsaxe Municipality, Erhard Jakobsen, congratulated the players at the following match against B 1908 on 24 October, where they were also presented with the league trophy at a reception. The Søborg-based club only made use of 14 players overall, while B 1908 in contrast had 6 new players in their 11 November home clash against BK Stefan and x reserve players at ... The squad of BK Hero was composed of goalkeeper Eigil Larsen, defenders Poul Larsen and John Petersen, midfielders Knud Jørgensen, Preben Møller, Kjeld Petersen and Søren Bjerring, forwards Bent Knudsen, Torben Michaelsen, Mogens Langkilde, Tonny Poppe, Kaj Christensen, Erik Poppe and Preben Bendtner, and was coached by Hans Hannibal. They were part of the five most goal-oriented matches. The league's clubs entered the 1964–65 Danish Cup in the second qualifying round for members of the Copenhagen FA. BK Hero, Kastrup BK and BK Fremad Valby reached the second round proper of the main cup tournament. Three KBU-members were relegated from the fourth tier, leaving one relegation spot to the worst placed team in the Copenhagen Series. Handelsstandens BK sealed their relegation to the sixth tier after having lost their away match against Kastrup BK on 24 November, a fixture that was part of the match day 17.

Teams
Ten teams competed in the league's group A – nine teams from the previous season and one team promoted from the regional second tier. The promoted team was Østerbros BK, who returned after a two-year absence, replacing BK Dalgas, who had won promotion to the 1964 Kvalifikationsturneringen. Handelsstandens BK finished the previous season in the last spot, but was not relegated due to no Copenhagen-based teams being relegated from the fourth tier. The league had three Valby-based teams of which two of them played their matches at Valby Idrætspark, while the third team played their matches at Frederiksberg Idrætspark in Frederiksberg.

Stadiums and locations

Personnel

Coaching changes
Jørgen Vendelbo switched to Hørsholm-Usserød IK at some point during the season.

League table
In group A, every team played two games against the other teams, at home and away, totaling 18 games each, while each team in group B played two games against the other teams for a total of 24 games. Teams received two points for a win and one point for a draw. If two or more teams were tied on points, places were determined by goal average. The team with the most points were crowned winners of the group and joint winners of the league. The winners of group A were promoted to the 1965 Kvalifikationsturneringen. The team with the fewest points in both group B would be relegated to the 1965 KBUs Mellemrække. The number of relegations in group A was dependent on how many of the five KBU members, participating in the 1964 Kvalifikationsturneringen, that would be relegated from the fourth tier. Due to the Copenhagen FA's pre-season decision to expand the league to include twelve teams, somewhere between zero and three teams could be relegated.

Københavnsserien, group A

Københavnsserien, group B

Results

Københavnsserien, group A

Københavnsserien, group B

Group A statistics

Scoring

Top scorers
There were 356 goals scored in 90 matches, for an average of 3.96 goals per match. Three own goals were scored during the tournament.

Hat-tricks

 4 Player scored 4 goals

Clean sheets

Discipline

Player
 Most evictions: 1
  Bjørn Basbøll (BK Frederiksholm) on 24 November 1964 against BK Stefan

Club
 Most evictions: 1
 BK Frederiksholm

References

1963–64 in European fifth tier association football leagues
1964–65 in European fifth tier association football leagues
1964 in Danish football
Copenhagen Football Championship seasons